Rhaptopetalum is a genus of plants in the family Lecythidaceae.

, Kew's Plants of the World Online accepted the following species:

 Rhaptopetalum beguei Mangenot
 Rhaptopetalum belingense Letouzey
 Rhaptopetalum breteleri Letouzey
 Rhaptopetalum cheekii Prance
 Rhaptopetalum coriaceum Oliv.
 Rhaptopetalum depressum Letouzey
 Rhaptopetalum evrardii R.Germ.
 Rhaptopetalum geophylax Cheek & Gosline
 Rhaptopetalum pachyphyllum Engl.
 Rhaptopetalum roseum (Gürke) Engl.
 Rhaptopetalum sessilifolium Engl.
 Rhaptopetalum sindarense Pellegr.

References

 
Ericales genera
Taxonomy articles created by Polbot
Taxa named by Daniel Oliver